Jesús Martínez Ross (born 7 May 1934) is a Mexican politician belonging to the Partido Revolucionario Institucional (PRI). From 1973 to 1975, he held a seat in the Chamber of Deputies, representing Quintana Roo's First District. 
Between 1975 and 1981 he served as the first elected governor of Quintana Roo following statehood.

References 

Governors of Quintana Roo
People from Villahermosa
Living people
1934 births
Members of the Chamber of Deputies (Mexico)
Institutional Revolutionary Party politicians